Alan John Halford (1 November 1934 – 25 September 1984) was an English cricketer.  Halford's batting style is unknown, but he was a right-arm fast-medium bowler.  He was born in Leicester, Leicestershire.

Halford made his debut for Norfolk in the 1967 Minor Counties Championship against Staffordshire.  Halford played Minor counties cricket for Norfolk from 1967 to 1969, which included 18 Minor Counties Championship appearances.  He made his List A debut against Yorkshire in the 1969 Gillette Cup.  In this match, he took the wicket of Phil Sharpe for the cost of 34 runs from 12 overs, while with the bat he was dismissed for 5 runs by Chris Old.  He made a further List A appearance against Middlesex in the 1970 Gillette Cup.  In this match, he took the wicket of Clive Radley for the cost of 73 runs from 12 overs, while with the bat he was dismissed for a duck by John Price.

References

External links
Alan Halford at ESPNcricinfo
Alan Halford at CricketArchive

1934 births
1984 deaths
Cricketers from Leicester
English cricketers
Norfolk cricketers